Erector is the third full-length studio album by power electronics band Whitehouse, released in February 1981 through Come Organization. The record was reissued twice: once in 1995 on CD through Susan Lawly, and again in 2008 on vinyl through Very Friendly.

Track listing

Personnel
William Bennett - vocals, synthesizers
Paul Reuter - synthesizer
Peter McKay - synthesizer
George Peckham - mastering (original release)
Denis Blackham - mastering (reissue)
Steven Stapleton - artwork (vinyl edition)
Athol Drummond - artwork (CD edition)

References

External links
  (List of releases)

1981 albums
Whitehouse (band) albums